A ghazal is a poetic form with couplets that share a rhyme and a refrain.

Ghazal or Gazal may also refer to:

Entertainment
 Gazal (1964 film), an Indian Urdu-Hindi film
 Ghazal (1975 film), an Iranian film
 Ghazal (1993 film), an Indian Malayalam film
 Ghazal (band), a world fusion group

People

Surname
 Albert Gazal (born 1950), Israeli footballer 
 Ali Ghazal (born 1992), Egyptian footballer 
 Daif Abdul-kareem Al-Ghazal (1976–2005), Libyan journalist
 Edwin (musician) (born 1968 as Edwin Ghazal), Canadian musician
 Majd Eddin Ghazal (born 1987), Syrian high jumper
 Ravid Gazal (born 1982), Israeli footballer 
 Salim Ghazal (1931–2011), Lebanese Melkite bishop

Given name
 Ghazal El Jobeili (born 1986), Lebanese swimmer
 Ghazal Omid (born 1970), Iranian-Canadian author
 Ghazal Srinivas (born 1966), Indian singer

See also
 ʿAin Ghazal, Neolithic archaeological site located in metropolitan Amman, Jordan
 al-Ghazal, 9th-century Andalusi diplomat
 Gazel, a Turkish form of improvised solo singing